Sengoku Lord in Nagoya was a professional wrestling event promoted by New Japan Pro-Wrestling (NJPW). The event took place on July 25, 2020, in Nagoya, Aichi, at the Aichi Prefectural Gymnasium and was the second event under the Sengoku Lord name, the second in a row in Nagoya, and second in a row that took place at the Aichi Prefectural Gymnasium.

Background
Sengoku Lord in Nagoya took place on July 25, 2020. Due to the effects of the COVID-19 pandemic, the arena was limited to one-third of its capacity.

Storylines
Sengoku Lord in Nagoya featured professional wrestling matches that involve different wrestlers from pre-existing scripted feuds and storylines. Wrestlers portray villains, heroes, or less distinguishable characters in the scripted events that built tension and culminated in a wrestling match or series of matches.

Results

See also
2020 in professional wrestling
List of NJPW pay-per-view events

References

External links
Official New Japan Pro-Wrestling website

New Japan Pro-Wrestling
2020 in professional wrestling
July 2020 events in Japan
Events in Nagoya
Professional wrestling in Japan